Fatim Badjie (born November 13, 1983) is a Gambian entrepreneur.

Born in Banjul, Badjie is the daughter of Dembo M. Badjie, who served as Gambia's ambassador to Sierra Leone, India and China for a time; she is a member of the Jola tribe, and was educated at the Gambia Senior Secondary School and in Belgium before attending Tennessee State University and receiving a bachelor's degree in communication and later a master's degree from University of Manchester in ICT for development. She was employed at Comium Gambia, a cellphone company, as senior communications officer. In March 2008 she was appointed Minister of Communications, Information and Information Technology, replacing Neneh Macdouall-Gaye in the position. At the time, she was the youngest person ever appointed to the Gambian cabinet. She lost her ministry a year later, but was later named Minister of Health and Social Welfare. She has been a member of Sigma Gamma Rho sorority since 2003. She currently runs a communication and program management consultancy firm called Ace Communications Executive (ACE).

References

1983 births
Living people
Gambian women diplomats
People from Banjul
Tennessee State University alumni
21st-century Gambian women politicians
21st-century Gambian politicians
Women government ministers of the Gambia
Health ministers of the Gambia
Social affairs ministers of the Gambia
Communication ministers of the Gambia
Information ministers of the Gambia